Curtis D. Summers (September 17, 1929 – May 11, 1992) was an American engineer and roller coaster designer credited for designing or providing structural engineering on 25 wooden roller coasters around the world. He earned a degree in Architectural Engineering from Kansas State University and was a registered engineer in 40 states.

Career 
Curtis D. Summers began his career in the amusement industry when he was contacted by Cincinnati's Coney Island to provide structural repairs to the park's Shooting Star roller coaster. He was hired by the Hixson Engineering Company and worked with Coney to keep the park's two wooden coasters, Shooting Star and Wildcat, structurally sound. In 1972, Summers left Hixson Engineering to start his own firm, Curtis D. Summers, Inc., based in Cincinnati, Ohio The owners of Coney Island, Taft Broadcasting, closed the park in order to escape the repeated flooding from the Ohio River and built a new park, Kings Island, 25 miles to the north. Summers was asked to design most of the structures of the new park and worked alongside John C. Allen to assist him by providing the structural engineering on the two new wooden coasters constructed for the park.

The Taft Broadcasting Company, and its successor, Kings Entertainment Company (KECO), went on to build two more amusement parks, Kings Dominion and Canada's Wonderland. They purchased an existing park, Carowinds; managed California's Great America and were co-owners of Australia's Wonderland. Curtis D. Summers and his firm continued to be the primary engineers for each of the parks. When John Allen retired from the coaster-building business in 1976, Summers took over as the primary designer of wooden coaster projects for the Taft/KECO chain of amusement parks.

In 1978 KECO started building The Beast at Kings Island. Summers' firm was brought on board to provide structural engineering for the massive helix finale. The project was built in-house and was overseen by Charles (Charlie) Dinn, Kings Island's Director of Construction, Maintenance and Engineering. Dinn left Kings Island in 1984 to start his own firm the Dinn Corporation. In 1985 he contacted Summers' firm to provide the design for the restoration of the helix of Paragon Park's Giant Coaster which Dinn was moving to Wild World in Largo, Maryland. That was the start of relationship that lasted until 1991. Following a few more coaster moves and rebuilds, the two teamed up in 1987 to start building new coasters. The two companies always operated separately but every new coaster built by the Dinn Corporation from 1988 to 1991 was engineered by Curtis D. Summers. Ten of these "Dinn & Summers" coasters were built during that time period, and many of them featured record-breaking drops.

Dinn retired in 1991 and closed the Dinn Corporation. Summers went on to design one more coaster, Jupiter at Kijima Amusement Park in Japan. The coaster was built by Intamin and opened in July 1992, a few months after Summers died. Two of the designers from Curtis Summers Inc. went on to start their own firms. Dennis Starkey started the Stand Company and Larry Bill worked a number of years for Custom Coasters International before becoming one of the founders of The Gravity Group.

Wooden roller coasters

Miscellaneous projects
Carowinds, design of renovation and additions to park and 8,000 seat amphitheater
Canada's Wonderland, complete park design including buildings and ride stations
Kentucky Kingdom, Flume foundation design
Kings Dominion, complete park design including buildings, ride stations and steel frame mountain
Kennywood, foundation design for Shuttle Loop and Pirate Ship
Raging Waters Waterpark (Wildwood, NJ), design of speed slide and raft ride
Surf Cincinnati, design of speed slide and raft ride
Six Flags St. Louis, foundation for Looping Star (Jet Scream) coaster
Splashtown, USA, water ride supports and foundation

Sources
Curtis D. Summers, Inc. "Listing of Representative Projects," inserted into a company promotional booklet, likely distributed at the IAAPA trade show circa 1987.

References

External links 
 Curtis D. Summers at the Roller Coaster DataBase

Roller coaster designers
20th-century American engineers
Kansas State University alumni
1929 births
1992 deaths
People from Abilene, Kansas